Mimolaia buckleyi is a species of beetle in the family Cerambycidae. It was described by Bates in 1885. It is known from Bolivia.

References

Calliini
Beetles described in 1885